Snap legislative elections are set to be held in Kazakhstan on 19 March 2023 to elect the members of the Mäjilis. This will be the ninth legislative election since Kazakhstan's independence in 1991 and the first snap election for the Mäjilis seats since 2016. It will be held alongside with the 2023 local elections.

At the September 2022 State of the Nation Address, President Kassym-Jomart Tokayev announced snap legislative elections to take place in the first half of 2023 in the aftermath of deadly unrest in January 2022. During that time, a series of laws and amendments were approved following the 2022 constitutional referendum, which aimed to reform Kazakhstan's political system by granting more parliamentary powers to the lower chamber Mäjilis as well as for its mandate seats to be allocated via mixed-member majoritarian representation for the first time since 2004.

Background 

The 7th Parliament of Kazakhstan was formed in the aftermath of the 2021 legislative elections, in which the composition of the lower chamber Mäjilis was left unchanged as only three pro-government parties, Nur Otan (now Amanat), Aq Jol Democratic Party, and the People's Party of Kazakhstan, retained their factions in the parliament. The ruling Nur Otan party, though unusually losing more seats, continued to keep their 76-seat supermajority control of the Mäjilis. The legislative elections were the first to take place following the resignation of President Nursultan Nazarbayev in 2019. At that time, Nazarbayev continued serving as the chairman of Nur Otan and had held a variety of notable political positions and powers in his post-presidency, most importantly the influential Security Council chairmanship. Following the 2021 elections, Mäjilis chairman Nurlan Nigmatulin (Nur Otan) and Prime Minister Asqar Mamin were reappointed to their respective posts, along with Dariga Nazarbayeva returning as an MP were moves described as a continued political influence held by Nazarbayev over the new parliament due to his control over the ruling party and an open endorsement of those key government names.

Throughout the course of the 7th Parliament, a series of major constitutional and political reforms in par with President Kassym-Jomart Tokayev's policies took place in Kazakhstan with hundreds of proposed bills being passed by the Mäjilis.

2022 unrest and constitutional referendum 

In January 2022, massive protests and unrest occurred in Kazakhstan after a sudden increase in liquefied petroleoum gas (LPG) prices in the city of Zhanaozen. The protests originally started as small rallies from Zhanaozen with demands in reduction of the LPG prices, but quickly spread grew to nationwide protests in calls for political and socioeconomic reforms. President Tokayev, in a failed attempt to appease the growing protests, pledged to take measures by setting a price cap on LPG and other forms of fuel and basic food products, as well as instituting a moratorium on utility costs and rent subsidies for low-income people. This led him to dismiss Asqar Mamin's government and enact a state of emergency, along with a deadly force order which was provided by the backing of foreign peacekeeping forces from the Collective Security Treaty Organization, after chaotic unrest broke out in the largest city of Almaty and the rest of Kazakhstan's territory.

As the aftermath of the 2022 unrest was left with inflicted civilian casualties and costly property damages across the country, President Tokayev – following his takeover of the Security Council chairmanship from Nazarbayev – announced a new wave of political and constitutional reforms in a March 2022 State of the Nation Address. These reforms would lessen his executive powers and allocate more authority to the parliament. To do so, he initiated a referendum that would allow for Kazakh citizens to directly vote for the proposed 56 amendments. In a 2022 constitutional referendum, an overwhelming majority of Kazakhs had officially voted in favour for changes to the Constitution of Kazakhstan, which changed nearly a total of one-third or 33 articles in the document. The newly proposed amendments included changes within the structure of governance, electoral system, decentralisation of power between the levels of governments, and paved the way for complete stripping of Nazarbayev's remaining constitutional powers.

2022 presidential election 

Amid speculations of power consolidation, President Tokayev announced 2022 snap presidential elections for November in his September 2022 State of the Nation Address, citing his personal need for a "new mandate of trust from the people" and said that the early election would "significantly lower the risks of power monopolisation". The move was described by Reuters as an attempt by Tokayev to strengthen his "mandate as an independent leader" and potentially avoid economic deterioration and loss of public support if holding elections ahead of originally scheduled date for 2024. Sceptics suggested the possibility of Tokayev using the 2022 presidential elections as a way to extend his rule similarly to his predecessor Nazarbayev, citing Tokayev's current control over all major branches of Kazakh government and his proposal for a new constitutional amendment that would change the presidential term of office to a nonrenewable seven-year term. In an effort to boost his support after the announcement of elections, Tokayev declared amnesty for the participants in the January 2022 unrest and supported reverting the controversial capital name of Nur-Sultan back to Astana.

Due to early timing of the 2022 presidential election, the political sphere was left without the organisation of the opposition, as no new political party had been registered due to the Kazakh legislation restricting citizens in contesting the race. With exception of Tokayev seeking reelection, other presidential contestants were described as "pocket candidates" due to their little public popularity who did not pose any significant electoral challenge to Tokayev. The results left Tokayev securing an 81.3% landslide victory in the election, with Tokayev in his inaugural speech promising to fulfill his election programme within the remaining seven years of his presidential term.

2023 Senate elections 

After assuming office, Tokayev announced January 2023 Senate elections, stressing the need in "continuation of the practical implementation of the constitutional reform", adding that the results will allow for Senate deputy corps to be renewed in "principles of competition and openness". This decision came after constitutional changes in the structure and powers of the Senate and the coming term expiration for senators that were previously elected in 2017, to which the senate election would be conducted as part of Tokayev's political reforms.

In total, 20 senators were elected by local assemblies (mäslihats) with 130 people initially nominating their candidacies, including several barred activists who claimed of constitutional rights violations that prevented them from becoming candidates.

Snap election speculations 
Speculations of snap elections for parliament began during the January 2022 unrest, with unconfirmed media reports of Tokayev potentially discussing the issue of dissolving the 7th Parliament. A variety of predictions were made, many of which predicted snap legislative elections sometime in late 2022 or early 2023.

After Tokayev initially announced his package of political reforms in the upcoming September 2022 State of the Nation Address, several political commentators expressed support for holding snap legislative elections, with political analyst Zamir Qarajanov citing a need in change of laws regarding elections and MPs and that the if a snap election is called by Tokayev, then it would likely be held sometime around January and February 2023. According to Gaziz Äbişev, the drafting of new political reforms would concern parties and elections and that it would lead to the issue of the early dissolution of the parliament being raised. Proponents of an early vote for Mäjilis concluded that Tokayev must first present his package of political reforms that would allow for newer parties to form and conduct the legislative timeframe for their implementation before scheduling a snap election date. Political scientist Älibek Tajibaev argued against snap election, saying that the parliamentary formation is strongly tied with the general election style, noting that voting dates are "predetermined chronologically" and that non-parliamentary and newly formed parties should prepare for the regularly scheduled 2025 legislative election by instead focusing their campaigning first in municipal races.

Despite widescale discussions of a potential snap election, Mäjilis chairman Erlan Qoşanov in April 2022 dismissed any rumours of an early dissolution of the 7th Parliament, claiming that issues of holding an early vote had not been discussed at all.

However, on 1 September 2022 at the State of the Nation Address, Tokayev officially announced snap legislative elections in the first half of 2023. He cited the need for the legislative bodies to be "naturally renewed" and said that a new parliamentary composition will represent the interests of "broad groups of citizens" to allow executive branch to enact more "balanced decisions", adding that the snap legislative election would conclude "a reset and renewal of all major political institutions". At the 23 November 2022 plenary session of the Mäjilis, chairman Qoşanov in regard to the timing for an upcoming snap election, stated that the announcement of it would be made by Tokayev and forecast the date to be held sometime in 2023. Shortly after Tokayev's reelection win in the 2022 presidential election, he signed a decree on 26 November in approving an action plan made under the basis of his electoral programme, which initially included a deadline in holding of a Mäjilis election no later than June 2023.

Dissolution of the 7th Parliament 
In early January 2023, the insider source of KazTAG reported on the 7th Parliament's dissolution taking place within a coming week, to which the possibility of it was confirmed on 11 January by the head of the Mäjilis Committee on Legislation and Judicial and Legal Reform Arman Qojahmetov, who suggested for the dissolution to be declared by Tokayev sometime in the month of January, though not ruling out the power of Mäjilis members to request the parliament to be dissolved themselves.

On 19 January 2023, Tokayev signed a presidential decree in officially abolishing the 7th Parliament and scheduling the snap elections for Mäjilis to take place on 19 March 2023, a date noted to specifically coincide with Nowruz and former president Nursultan Nazarbayev's resignation four years earlier. Upon singing the decree, Tokayev praised the Mäjilis members for their legislative work, saying that they had set the example of "high professionalism, responsibility to citizens and sincere patriotism". In a following address to Kazakh citizens, Tokayev expressed hope for the "updated compositions of deputies" and that the Central Election Commission and the Prosecutor General's Office alongside with poll observers will strictly monitor the "rule of law, transparency and fairness" of the election, whilst taking into account of campaign demonstrating "a high level of political culture" and contributing the "consolidation of our society". He also added that the snap elections will be final stage of "rebooting state institutions" that would coincide with the formula of a "strong President – influential Parliament – accountable Government".

Electoral system 

Under Article 85 of the Constitutional Law "On Elections", the legislative elections in Kazakhstan for the Mäjilis members, who are known as deputies, are held within five years after the expiration of a legal term length for Mäjilis members. In accordance with Article 51 of the Constitution, a person must be at least 25 years or older and had been a permanent resident for the last ten years in Kazakhstan to serve as a member of the Mäjilis.

2022 amendments 
Following constitutional changes as a result of the 2022 referendum, the number of seats in the Mäjilis were reduced from 107 to 98 (due to the abolition of the previous nine-seat quota that was reserved to the Assembly of People of Kazakhstan), leaving all the remaining seats to be elected through mixed-member majoritarian representation for the first time since 2004.

Under the new electoral system, the Mäjilis (consisting of total 98 members) is divided into the following methods of election: 70% (69 members) from closed list party-list proportional representation allocated using the largest remainder method and 30% (29 members) from single-member districts that use the first-past-the-post voting (FPTP) method.

Electoral and party-list quota 
Under the Kazakh law, a series of legal quotas are mandated regarding to the political party's overall performance in the election and its electoral list of candidates.

Article 97-1 of the Constitutional Law "On Elections" establishes a minimum of 5% electoral threshold (previously reduced from 7% in 2021) for a party to earn proportional representational seats in the Mäjilis. If only one party obtains at least 5% of the proportional vote share, then the party that received the next largest number of votes and hadn't overcome the electoral barrier is allowed to receive at least two mandates.

Since the 2021 election, a mandatory fixed share of political representatives had been in place, which Article 89 of the Constitutional Law "On Elections" requires for parties to include at least 30% quota of women, young people (aged under 29), and disabled persons within their electoral lists.

Electoral districts 

On 22 November 2022, the Central Election Commission (CEC) adopted a resolution in reestablishing electoral districts in Kazakhstan, upon which were previously dissolved in 2007 amendment, beginning on 1 January 2023 that would guarantee each region including cities of republican significance (Almaty, Astana, and Shymkent) a one representative seat, with all constituencies including no more than the 20% difference between the number of registered voters residing in them.

The list of boundaries of the newly formed 29 single-member districts were drawn up and published on 24 December 2022, with the city of Almaty and Turkistan Region having the most elected representatives due to their population sizes.

Timetable 
Article 85 of the Constitutional Law "On Elections" stipulates that the legislative elections must be scheduled by the President five months in advance and conducted within two months before the termination of a current established term length for Mäjilis members (since 14 January 2021), in which the legislative elections should have been originally held no later than 14 November 2025.

In a Central Election Commission (CEC) meeting on 20 January 2023, deputy chairman Konstantin Petrov unveiled the calendar plan for the 2023 legislative election, upon which the total duration amounted to 59 days:

Parties
Prior to the 2021 legislative elections, the mandatory threshold for party registration was initially reduced to 20,000 members in a way to allow for new parties to be formed. Despite the laxed rules, no new parties were registered during that time period as the Ministry of Justice repeatedly rejected the wishing parties' application requests. Eventually, President Tokayev proposed a constitutional law in lowering the registration threshold even more to 5,000 and reiterated that new parties will appear in political sphere, though asserted that some parties could not be "artificially" registered due to their violations of the law. He also later did not rule out the possibility of some newly upcoming Mäjilis members to hold opposition views.

Prior before the constitutional amendments regarding the eased party registration rules came to force, there were a total of 16 initiative groups formed in attempt to seek their legalised party status. Both the opposition parties of Alga, Qazaqstan and Namys failed to obtain their legal statuses. These instances were described due to inability of the Kazakh government registering independent parties that pose "real competition" and that only pro-government organisation would be registered.

Contesting 
On 21 January 2023, the Central Election Commission (CEC) announced the admission of all seven registered political parties to participate in the 2023 legislative elections to field their candidates according to their party lists.

However, Vice Justice Minister Alma Mūqanova revealed that the ministry was considering two parties of El tağdyry and Ūrpaqtar jalğastyğy of their applicational documents and that if they succeed in passing state registration by 8 February 2023, then the additional parties would be permitted to also take part in the election. In spite of that, no further party registrations took place during that timeframe, thus leaving exactly seven previously registered parties to contest the race in the end.

The CEC on 18 February 2022 conducted a draw procedure which established the number listing that each contesting party appeared on the ballot by order:

Candidates by party affiliation 
There were 283 candidates chosen from all seven participating parties within electoral lists, as well as 609 candidates nominated in all single-member districts in which overwhelmingly 525 were self-nominees (independents) whilst 79 candidates from seven political parties and 5 candidates from four public associations. The average number of nominated contestants in each electoral district was 21 with the most being in two of Astana constituencies (63 candidates each) and the least in Ulytau Region (6 candidates).

Following the registration period, 281 party list nominees officially became candidates (as two from Respublica dropped out of the race), with a mandatory quota of women, youth and persons with disabilities in each party list averaging to 38.1% of candidates as well as 12 ethnical representatives. In single-member districts, a total of 435 candidates were registered with 359 (82.5%) independents and 76 (17.5%) from parties, leaving 125 people having their candidatures rejected by the CEC due to voluntarily withdraws, improper document submissions, and campaign law violations. The average of constituent candidate was approximately 49–50 years old, with an overall gender composition making up of 350 (80.5%) male and 85 (20%) female including 10 ethnical representatives. There were an average of 15 registered candidates in Kazakhstan's electoral districts as the greatest number of contestants being within the constituencies of Astana (41 and 42 candidates each), with the lowest in Turkistan constituency (5 candidates).

Campaign 
According to Vice Minister of Information and Social Development Qanat Ysqaqov, the ministry would monitor information field during the electoral campaign and report any violations to the Prosecutor General's Office. Jandos Ömiräliev, the Deputy Prosecutor General, cited that the unlawful acts in the election would be conducting election campaigning during the period of its prohibition, obstruction of candidates as well as their proxies or political parties during their canvassing.

People's Party of Kazakhstan 
The People's Party of Kazakhstan (QHP) in a political council meeting on 21 January 2023 announced that the party would actively participate in the elections and established the republican campaign headquarters.

On 30 January 2023, the 23rd QHP Extraordinary Congress was held. From there, party chairman Ermūhamet Ertısbaev called on Kazakh citizens to show up at polling stations rather than public squares to fulfill all demands "in a civilized and democratic way", embarking the effectiveness of changing the system via means of parliamentary resolutions. A number of issues were discussed at the congress, upon which were related to energy and industry, maternal support, as well as land transfer and migratory employment. Prior before the congress was held, the QHP experienced discontent within the party's membership as its three Mäjilis serving members most notably Jambyl Ahmetbekov had left the QHP with Ahmetbekov citing the unfitting new leadership of the party. The QHP in its party list included a total 52 people as well as 12 candidates in majoritarian districts for the election, to which Ertısbaev described the names as being the "best and most worthy members of the political organisation" and noted the multinational and social composition of the QHP candidates. According to Ertısbaev, the QHP had initially included more than 120 people in its party list, which was eventually narrowed down to in way to correlate with the actual distribution of seats in the Mäjilis, with Ertısbaev expressing confidence that the party would sweep around 40–45 seats.

Aq Jol Democratic Party 
In a statement published by the Aq Jol Democratic Party on 20 January 2023, the party expressed its interest in taking part for Mäjilis election to which it should serve as the beginning of a "profound and fundamental change" in the fate of Kazakhstan.

The Aq Jol in its 21st Ordinary Congress on 1 February 2023, upon which was attended by the party members, adopted a decision in participating in the legislative election along the party's election programme. A total of 77 Aq Jol candidates were nominated with 54 of them being in the party list that included such people as chairman Azat Peruashev, Dania Espaeva, Qazybek Isa and Älia Raqyşeva. One of the names in the list was "Qairat Boranbaev", despite everyone suspecting that it may have been the controversial businessman Qairat Boranbaev who faced criminal investigations for alleged money embezzlement, it turned out to be a different person with the same name While the rest of 23 candidates were nominated for single-member districts by the Aq Jol. At the congress, Peruashev raised the issue regarding corruption and the "gap between rich and poor" due to a monopoly impact in economic and political spheres which brings the issues on the party's relevancy. He also expressed his willingness for the Aq Jol in the election to "gain the trust of the people", noting that "any ruling party" will lose power "sooner or later".

Months prior to the election, Aq Jol MP , was ousted from the party and removed from Mäjilis over his public support for Russia's invasion of Ukraine. Some speculated that this controversy was an act made to advertise the party in a good light. It is notable, however, that Äbıldaev later appeared as a guest in Russian propagandist Vladimir Solovyov's controversial show Solovyov LIVE, where he expressed his negative opinion about the "rising nationalism in Kazakhstan".

Nationwide Social Democratic Party 
After previously boycotting the 2021 legislative elections, the opposition Nationwide Social Democratic Party (JSDP) expressed its willingness to take part in the snap election, citing the recent changes in "legislative conditions and the system of power itself". 

The JSDP held its 20th Extraordinary Congress on 2 February 2023, to where it was attended by 46 party delegates and adopted a decision in developing the election programme. It also fielded its 25 Mäjilis candidates with 19 people being included in the JSDP party list whilst the rest of six candidates vying for seats in electoral districts, to which party chairman Ashat Raqymjanov asserted their popularity within their constituents.

Baytaq 
The newly registered "Baytaq" Green Party of Kazakhstan on 20 January 2023 announced that it would participate for the first time in the election, citing an opportunity in changing the Kazakhstan's environmental responsibility policy. On 21 January, party chairman Azamathan Ämirtai revealed that Baytaq would aim at raising environmental issues within the parliamentary hearings.

The pre-election congress of Baytaq was held on 3 February 2023, from which Ämirtai while criticising other parties, insisted that the Baytaq party was fighting for "people's lives" by stressing the need of environmental protection in Kazakhstan and its correlation with the health and quality of life for citizens, to which Ämirtai described it as an "urgent issue". He addressed the needs in paying special attention to ecologic problematic areas of the Aral Sea and Semipalatinsk Test Site, as well as waste problems from subsoil users in western Kazakhstan. In a decision by the pre-election congress, 20 members were included in the party list of Baytaq, with an extra four candidates that included Ämirtai himself being nominated in territorial constituencies.

Auyl 
Äli Bektaev, chairman of the "Auyl" People's Democratic Patriotic Party, in his official statement supported the decision in holding snap elections and embarked that party is ready to fight "honestly and openly in the new election cycle".

On 4 February 2023, the 22nd Auyl Extraordinary Congress was held from where it approved a list of 25 party list candidates and nine candidates for majoritarian districts. Auyl chairman Äli Bektaev speaking at the congress, voiced his high hopes for the party's performance in the election due its improved structural work and stressed the importance of the development of agriculture, agrarian sphere, and rural settlements to which Bektaev emphasised that enhancing the situation and citizens lives in villages would in turn lead to a subsequent improvement in urban cities. The published party list of Auyl received an unusual media attention after its names included both 2022 presidential candidates of the Auyl's first deputy chairman Jiguli Dairabaev and former ruling Amanat party member Qaraqat Äbden in the same listing, with Bektaev confirming Äbden's membership into the Auyl by stating that her social views on folk and rural traditions correlated with the party's ideology.

Respublica 
On 21 January 2023, Respublica chairman Aidarbek Hodjanazarov in the aftermath of the party's registration announced that Respublica would for the first time participate in the legislative elections, noting that the party would conduct the "most transparent and fair selection" of candidates. On 3 February 2023, it was announced that Respulica would hold its 1st Extraordinary Congress, where the party's updated charter would be presented and approved. 

The congress held in an informal tie-less format took place on 6 February, where Hodjanazarov stated that Respublica prioritises human capital as being "the greatest wealth" of Kazakhstan, specifically being in the fields of education and health. The party nominated a total of 29 candidates for the election from its list that included business representatives, with four competing for mandates in single-member districts.

Amanat 
Prior before announcement of legislative elections, Amanat chairman Erlan Qoşanov in April 2022 had voiced his anticipation on the party's preparedness in the upcoming vote. After the dissolution of the 7th Parliament, Qoşanov in a 20 January 2023 party meeting stated that the Amanat supported Tokayev's decision in calling snap elections and asserted that the party is the "main driving force of progressive transformations", citing the previous work in helping the affected residents of Kostanay and Ekibastuz, as well regions that faced storm floods to which Qoşanov reiterated the Amanat's position of taking part in the election. On 31 January, Qoşanov revealed the party would hold its upcoming extraordinary congress.

On 7 February 2023, the 25th Amanat Extraordinary Congress took place to which more than 2,000 people attended that included political council members, former 7th Mäjilis deputies, party delegates, members from the party's Jastar Ruhy youth wing, as well as experts, representatives from NGO and the media. The Amanat nominated a total of 119 candidates (90 from party list and 29 in single-member districts) that encompassed former MPs, government officials, as well as notable bloggers, sports and chess players to which party chairman Qoşanov described the candidates as being "authoritative, educated and qualified people" and assuring that the composition of Amanat had led for it to become a "party of leaders".

Independents 
In December 2022, a group of opposition activists and journalists, namely Arailym Nazarova, Älnur Iliaşev, Dinara Egeubaeva, and Duman Muhammedkärim, announced their candidacy for the 2023 legislative elections in Kazakhstan. They formed an independent electoral alliance called Altynşy Qañtar (Sixth January, in relation to the 2022 unrest), which aimed to support various opposition candidates running in both national and local races. Iliaşev stated that the bloc's ultimate goal was to bring about significant democratic reforms by gaining representation in the parliament. Out of the four mentioned names, only Egeubaeva and Nazarova were able to be successfully register as candidates, as Iliaşev and Muhammedkärim were both initially barred from running in the election due to their criminal records and failures to reside as permanent resident, respectively. However, Muhammedkärim successfully appealed his rejected candidature for the Kaskelen electoral district, resulting in his candidacy being registered in the constituency.

By early February 2023, several independent candidates had expressed interest in running for the constituent races for Mäjilis, which included businessman Sanjar Boqaev, leader of the unregistered Namys party; civil activist Inga Imanbai, spouse of jailed unregistered Democratic Party leader Janbolat Mamai; civil activist Maks Boqaev, participant in the 2016 anti-land reform protests; journalist Äset Mataev, founder of KazTAG news agency; journalist Ermurat Bapi, former chairman of the opposition Nationwide Social Democratic Party; and aqyn Rinat Zaiytov, participant in the 2019 presidential election protests. All of these candidates were registered to run, leaving only Maks Boqaev in failing to undergo the candidate registration process due to his current criminal conviction over involvement in the 2016 protests.

On 19 February 2023, civil activists Älnur Iliaşev and Murat Turymbetov, alongside with opposition independent candidates held a sanctioned campaign rally in Gandi Park, Almaty, to which 100 people attended. From there, Arailym Nazarova, head of NGO Independent Observers, criticised the percentage of majoritarian representation in the parliament and called for independent observation in the election as way to ensure the transparency of the vote. Äset Mataev in the rally supported an "independent parliament" composed of "free people" rather than "push-button deputies" that would make Kazakhstan "rich and happy", noting that the last "free elections" were held in 2004 by using Serikbolsyn Abdildin as an example of a candidate that managed to be elected through such system. Sociologist Janar Jandosova in participation of the rally, drew attention to a low voter turnout rate in Almaty and thus urged people to show up at the polls. Politician Muhtar Taijan, speaking at the event, asserted that if at least 10 opposition candidates manage to be elected in the parliament, then they would be able "to achieve reforms that the people need". While criticising President Tokayev's administration, Taijan also called on fair elections and stressed the need in "real and popular candidates" to come into power, in which he announced the formation of an electoral alliance in a following day that would be composed of independent candidates.

A press conference took place in Almaty on 20 February by independent opposition candidates on the official announcement of the creation of an electoral alliance, which included Aiman Tursunhan, Ermurat Bapi, Muhtar Taijan, Sanjar Boqaev, Erlan Qaliev as well as Altynşy Qañtar bloc founder Arailym Nazarova, to which she stated that her work was carried out autonomously and that she was not involved in the bloc's activities. The candidates stressed the need for unification of independent candidates in order to "increase the competence of parliament as a common goal", not ruling out the demands in returning a parliamentary system in Kazakhstan and poised themselves as supporters of majoritarian representation. At the conference, an election manifesto was adopted by the founding bloc, which pledged to maintain the balance of three branches of government, ensuring greater local government, freedom of press, and the nation's wealth belonging to the people while under pretext of a "strong parliament, accountable government" (a somewhat resemblance of President Tokayev's ideological view).

Controversies

Campaign law violations 
Prior before the campaigning period, the ruling Amanat party received widespread attention from social media after the party's election advertisement was spotted being illegally installed on several public billboard displays in Karaganda, a day in advance by the required law. In response to the backlash, the Amanat party's regional branch acknowledging the violation of the election law in an official statement, revealed that its campaign banner was hung by its advertising contractors and that the banner was subsequently removed within 30 minutes after the party's regional branch responded to the complaints. The party also announced that it would it take legal action and unilaterally terminate its contract with the service providers behind the incident. Opposition activist and independent MP candidate, Sanjar Boqaev, criticised the ruling Amanat party following the incident, in which he called for the party to be barred from participating in the elections, citing the legal provision within the election law in regard to its violation.

Several opposition candidates also had come under scrutiny by the Kazakh prosecutors, due to allegedly violating eleciton laws as well such as independents Marat Jylanbaev, Amangeldi Jahin, and Jasulan Aitmağanbetov, by which they were accused of illegally conducting their agitation on social media during the pre-campaign timeframe of the election and in result, faced fines and revoking of their candidacy registration. Despite the punishments, the independent candidates dismissed the court's rulings, insisted that communication on social media was not legally defined as an "agitation". Temirtas Synmetullaev, MP candidate from Karaganda, received a fine on 2 March 2023 due to his pre-campaign Facebook posts in which he denied accusations, claiming the use of alleged photoshopping over his posted words.

The Prosecutor General's Office of Kazakhstan issued a conclusive report on 17 March, stating 23 election law violations, mainly related to prohibited campaigning (such as unspecified candidates providing free taxi rides or sand-gravel mixture services), unauthorized independent polling, and distribution of anonymous or vandalizing campaign materials.

Exclusion of independent candidates 
A number of independent candidates were barred and even excluded from the national and local elections despite previously overgoing the registration requirements, mainly due to their tax noncompliances to even allegations of copyright infringements as well by the courts. Deputy PM and Finance Minister Erulan Jamaubaev denied any political motivations for the refusals in registration of independent candidates for the election, adding that the State Revenue Committee would verify mistakes in the candidates' financial declarations.

Civil activist Äigerım Tıleujan originally had her candidacy rejected by the Almaty's District Election Commission No. 3 on 17 February 2023, due to her electoral registration fee being deemed not authentic as Tıleujan was under investigation by the Kazakh authorities for allegedly inciting an attack on the Almaty International Airport during the January 2022 unrest. In an appeal effort, Tıleujan successfully won a lawsuit against the district election commission's decision in a ruling made by the Supreme Court of Kazakhstan on 27 February, thus essentially becoming a registered candidate in the election. However on 11 March 2023, Tıleujan was once again removed from the race by the district election commission, due to "discrepancies" in her tax returns. Qaiyrğali Köneev, a physician and public figure, was denied registration as an independent MP candidate on the absurd basis of leaving Kazakhstan and never returning despite having to physically lived and worked in Almaty the whole time, in which Köneev ironically demanded to be awarded and nominated for the Nobel Prize as being the world's first teleported person.

In response to increasing pressure by the Kazakh government over its removal of independent candidates, opposition activists in a press conference on 9 March 2023 voiced their concerns over the issue, complaining about being "illegally alienated" from the elections and that the decision was unfounded, an allegation that was dismissed by the CEC member Şavkat Ötemisov as he suggested for candidates to instead "appeal to the court and try again to participate in the elections." On 17 March, the CEC reported that a total of 166 complaints were filed to the courts by the removed candidates and that only six of the candidates had their registration successfully reinstated. According to Asylbek Aijaryquly, member of the CEC, an "objective decision" regarding the removal of independent candidates will be determined by a court case.

The frequent changes to the list of candidates posed challenges in preparing the voting ballots, as some candidates who had withdrawn from their constituent races were mistakenly included in the thousands of already printed ballots near election day. In Almaty, the chairwoman of the territorial election commission, Aigül Qalyqova, explained that election commission members were required by law to manually cross out the names of withdrawn candidates with a blue pen and leave their personal signatures next to the crossed-out columns.

Attacks against journalists 
With the announcement of the 2023 elections, growing attacks on journalists across Kazakhstan had occurred beginning with journalist Dinara Egeubaeva, a Mäjilis candidate and one of founders of the Altynşy Qañtar electoral alliance, faced an immediate intimidation shortly after announcing her interest in participating in the election in which a brick was thrown to her vehicle and then set on fire in the night of 14 January 2023 near her Almaty apartment. The following day on 15 January, the Kazakh law enforcement detained five underaged suspects who were 15, 16, and 17 years of age in which they allegedly received orders from an unknown individual in exchange for bribes according to their own testimonies and were also accused of breaking glass door entrance at the El Media office. Samal Ibraeva, chief editor of the Ulysmedia.kz, announced on 18 January 2023 that a cyberattack occurred on the site which leaked personal information of herself and family members, accusing the National Security Committee (ŪQK) of being behind the cyberattack. On 8 February 2023, the Ulysmedia.kz editorial office in Astana having received a box of "raw meat and pictures of children", to which she described the incident as "intimidation". Journalist Vadim Boreiko of the "Гиперборей" YouTube channel, reported of a burned construction foam outside his apartment door in Almaty, as well as two cars belonging to him and videographer Roman Yegorov being burned down on 20 February. The incident led to a swift response by the Almaty Department of Internal Affairs by launching investigation in which the unnamed suspect behind the arson was subsequently arrested. Daniar Moldabekov, a Kazakh journalist and author of the "5 Қаңтар" ("5 January") Telegram channel, revealed on 22 February that a man with a medical mask was shot in the entrance of his Almaty residence. Gulnoza Said, coordinator at the Committee to Protect Journalists, urged the Kazakh government to ensure that the journalists' safety and for the criminals to be held accountable.

The increasing threats on journalists essentially prompted for President Tokayev to intervene by instructing law enforcement agencies to conduct thorough investigation of criminal acts towards journalists, in which Aqorda press secretary Ruslan Jeldibai accused the criminal instigators of damaging "public security and the reputation of the state".  By 21 February 2023, the Ministry of Internal Affairs reported that 18 people had been arrested in relation to the attacks on journalists. Though, Deputy Internal Affairs Minister Marat Qojaev assessed that it was it was "too early to say that the attacks were carried out on the orders of someone." On 28 February, the Ministry of Internal Affairs and ŪQK announced the arrest of a suspect identified as "O. Tokarev", allegedly responsible for organised attacks against journalists and independent media, revealing that Tokarev was a foreign citizen and a skilled hacker, and he was accompanied by four other foreign nationals named "K. Litvinov," "S. Shapovalov," "B. Demchenko," and "Y. Malyshok." In an official report from 2 March 2023, it stated that Tokarev had pleaded guilty and agreed to cooperate with the Kazakh authorities in the criminal probe.

Electoral fraud allegations 
Concerns about electoral fraud arose ahead of the election, after photos circulating on social media from several polling stations in Shymkent had allegedly shown the existence of voting results protocols completed with numbers indicating the votes cast for each candidate shortly before polls were opened to the public. Ömir Şynybekuly, an independent candidate running in Shymkent II, called on the Prosecutor General's Office to intervene and urged President Tokayev to temporarily suspend the powers of the Shymkent City Akimat. In response, Shymkent Territorial Election Commission chairman Qaiybek Qunanbaev dismissed the claims of prepared voting protocol results as being "fake stuffing and provocation", insisting that election protocols are filled after voting takes place and noted the absence of a seal in the alleged precinct result tallies.

After polls opened on election day, independent monitoring NGO Erkindik Qanaty claimed election violations, which included restrictions on observer movements, limited visibility of the voter registration process, bans on photo and video recording, campaign activities by the precinct election commission chairman, and failure to provide an observer's chair which served as a violation of instructions for equipping the polling station.

Voting irregularities emerged across Kazakhstan, with numerous videos captured by independent observers showing instances of ballot box stuffing and carousel voting taking place in polling stations.

Conduct 
Elections in Kazakhstan are prepared and conducted and by various bodies of election commissions.

In a meeting held on 20 January 2023, the Central Election Commission (CEC) discussed a series of issues in relation to the appointment of elections, approval of a timetable, establishment of election document forms, and the activities of election observers from foreign states and international organisations, as well foreign media representatives.

Public funding 
The Ministry of Finance on 19 January 2023 announced that a total amount of 33.4 billion tenge originally would be spent for the 2023 election, a higher number than the 2022 presidential election funding, to which the Finance Ministry assessed that the costs for the snap election are included as part of the draft 2023–2025 budget and that the spending amount was initially reserved for 2025 fiscal year. According to the Ministry, the increased public expenses are taken into account for the introduction of a mixed electoral system. 

On 8 February 2023, the CEC confirmed that 33.4 billion tenge were officially allocated for the election.

Voter registration 
By 1 July and 1 January every year, information on voters and the boundaries of polling stations are submitted by the local executive bodies (akimats) in electronic form to their territorial election commissions, which ensure the verification and submission of information to the higher election commissions. There were approximately 11,976,406 registered voters in Kazakhstan as of 1 January 2023.

Voter registration in Kazakhstan is conducted by a local executive body from the moment of announcement or appointment of elections and are compiled within the voter list, which are based on place of residence in the territory of the given electoral precinct. The voter list for each polling station is approved by the akim (local head), who issues an ordinance twenty days (27 February 2023) before the election.

To vote absentee, a voter must notify the äkimat no later than thirty days (17 February 2023) before the election by applying their current place of residence for inclusion in a voter list at a different polling station. From 4 March 2023, absentee ballots began to be issued out to voters, which would take place until 18:00 local time on 18 March. 

As of 26 February 2023, the number of registered voters reached 12,032,550 people, upon which were all subsequently included in electoral rolls according to the data transferred by the akimats.  Fifteen days before election day (from 4 March 2023), Kazakh citizens were given an opportunity to verify themselves in voter listing for their respective polling stations. According to deputy chairman of the CEC, Konstantin Petrov, the informational data on registered voters will be transferred and protected by the Ministry of Digital Development, Innovation and Aerospace Industry, which would inform Kazakh citizens about their voter listing inclusion via SMS messaging.

On 17 March 2023, it was announced that Kazakh citizens without a residence permit would be allowed in registering to vote at 118 polling stations across the country on election day from 7:00 to 20:00 local time. The JSC Government for Citizens employees provided this service to allow citizens to exercise their voting and constitutional rights to which the polling stations included educational facilities, though voters who registered there were subsequently automatically deregistered after the election on March 20.

COVID-19 guidelines 

During the CEC briefing on 23 January 2023, Chief Sanitary Doctor of Kazakhstan Aijan Esmağambetova addressed the epidemiological situation regarding the ongoing COVID-19 pandemic, in which she noted a decrease in COVID-19 cases within the last two weeks though did not rule out the seasonal rise of the virus alongside with influenza infections. While Kazakhstan was classified under low-risk "green zone" nationwide in relation to the level of COVID-19's transmission, seven regions (cities of Shymkent, Almaty, and Atyrau; East Kazakhstan Region, Karaganda Region, Kostanay Region, and Mangystau Region) had the reproductive rate of the virus (R indicator) above one, which recommended face coverings in crowded settings.

When taking into account of these indications, Esmağambetova recommended for political organisations to hold events within spacious premises, upon which should be provided uninterrupted functioning of the ventilation system as well as urging residents living in the regions under the R-indicator above one to mask up in crowded areas.

Disabled voters 
In an effort to ensure the rights of disabled persons, the CEC on 27 January 2023 adopted a resolution which recommended for local executive bodies (akimats) to ensure and assist election commissions in providing voting conditions for people with disabilities at polling stations, checking the accessibility of polling stations with the participation of representatives from public associations of persons with disabilities, as well as provide additional measures to ensure special conditions. The CEC had also recommended for Kazakh citizens, the Ministry of Labour and Social Protection and akimats to update disabled voters' information, as well as locations of polling stations in the Interactive Accessibility Map.

On 27 February 2023, CEC chairman Nurlan Äbdirov revealed that polling stations would be equipped with all necessary conditions for persons with visual impairments, which would additional lighting and magnifiers.

Preparations 
On 23 January 2023, the CEC unveiled its main direction by prioritising the improvement of the "legal literacy and electoral culture" for all participants in the election process which included in conducting training and education for all nationwide election commission members in under following areas:

 Online workshop meetings;
 Field training and inspection workshop meetings in the regions;
 Distance learning and testing;
 Workshops for members of election commissions based on regional branches of the Academy of Public Administration under the President;
 Field training workshop meetings and trainings by territorial election commission (TEC) members;
 Workshops for members of 69 precinct election commissions formed at Kazakhstan's overseas representative offices.
Since the beginning of the election campaign, 230 call centers aimed at informing Kazakh citizens regarding their inclusion into electoral rolls were established in all regions of Kazakhstan, to which it received more than 17,000 requests by late February 2023.

The CEC approved five voting ballot designs for the 2023 election on 27 February, including blue-coloured ballots (party voting) and green-coloured ballots (constituency vote). For the first time, an ISO 216 paper format would be used as voting ballots for a better visual readability, in which party list vote ballots would contain eight columns and the constituency vote ballots include up to 16 candidate names. The CEC also established that the total number of printed paper ballots for the legislative elections would be based on the total number of registered voters (12,032,550 people), including an excess of 1% of the registered voting population, which would amount to 12,152,876 pieces for each party and constituency voting ballots.

On 27 February 2023, Vice Minister of Digital Development, Innovation and Aerospace Industry Äset Turysov announced that starting 6 March 2023, the Unified Platform of Internet Resources of State Bodies along with eGov.kz will launch the "Search for a polling station through Individual Identification Number (IIN)" system, as well as SMS notifications to mobile users. That same day, the Ministry of Foreign Affairs announced the formation of 77 polling stations in 62 countries for overseas voting, in which the ministerial representative Aibek Smadiarov urged Kazakh citizens wishing to take part in the election to contact and provide information to the foreign consular representation or institution of Kazakhstan to be included in their voter listing.

Observation 
Prior to the 2022 presidential election, the Parliament adopted new amendments to the election law, which tightened requirements of the accreditation process of public associations and NGOs to observe elections. According to Roman Reimer, co-founder of the NGO Erkindik Qanaty, the newly imposed laws would lead to a more difficult process of election accreditation and likely lead to a "destruction of independent observation", as well as severely restrict the election monitoring job at the polling stations.

On 20 January 2023, the Central Election Commission (CEC) Secretary Muqtar Erman announced in the opening of the Institution for International Election Observation, to which the CEC sent invitations to international, interparliamentary organisations, as well as the diplomatic corps in Kazakhstan to participate in monitoring for the 2023 election in order to meet international obligations in ensuring "openness and transparency during the electoral campaign". By 2 February 2023, the CEC accredited first 25 observers from Palestine and two international organisations of CIS Interparliamentary Assembly and Office for Democratic Institutions and Human Rights (ODIHR) under the Organization for Security and Co-operation in Europe (OSCE).

OSCE 
By the invitation by the CEC, the OSCE Office for Democratic Institutions and Human Rights (ODIHR) on 8 February 2023 opened its election observation mission in Kazakhstan, headed by Eoghan Murphy, which consisted of its core team of 11 international experts based in Astana, as well as 32 long-term observers that would be deployed throughout the country from 17 February. The ODIHR also announced in plans to deploy 300 short-term observers several days before election day.

Debates 
On 27 February 2023, the first televised debates between political parties were announced to be broadcast by the Qazaqstan channel, to which it was scheduled to be held for 1 March 2023 with the debates also being livestreamed on YouTube, Facebook, and Telegram channels of Qazaqstan. Representatives of all seven contesting parties took part in the 1 March election debate. The debate was comprised of four stages where party representatives answered a common political question briefly twice, asked and responded to each other's questions, and lastly with the representatives personally addressing voters. At the debate stage, a variety of issues were raised by the speakers in relation to societal injustice, improvement of working conditions, educational gap between urban and rural areas, raising of minimum wage, environmental protection, entrepreneurship development, and combatting corruption. The first televised debate discussion was noted to have completely neglected sensitive topics such as 2022 unrest and its aftermath investigation of victims' death, as well as issues of ongoing human rights violations in Kazakhstan, with the podium speakers unusually interrupting each other and violating the debate rules.

A second debate was announced on 6 March 2023 by the KTK channel to be held on 10 March in all its livestream platforms, to which the televised debate consisted of three stages starting with the party participants presenting their theses of the election programs, asking each other questions, and in the final stage making appeal to the voters. During the debate, People's Party of Kazakhstan (QHP) chairman Ermukhamet Ertisbaev made a notable proposal in forming a coalition government alongside the parties of Auyl and Baytaq.

The Central Election Commission (CEC) on 27 February 2023 had scheduled its third pre-election debate to take place on 16 March 2023, to which approximately 63 million tenge was allocated towards the hosting Khabar Agency for its televised debates between party representatives. On 7 March, the CEC approved a list of participants representing the parties at the podium, which initially included QHP chairman Ermukhamet Ertisbaev as an invitee, but instead later having QHP member Oksana Äubäkirova representing the party. During the debate, consisting of three rounds, the speakers introduced their party ideologies, asked questions to their opponents, discussed party policies for developing Kazakhstan's socioeconomic status, and answered questions from the Khabar Agency's cell center, with the third and final round concluding with addresses from each party representative.

Opinion polls

During an online survey conducted in the 10 March 2023 debate, a majority of KTK channel respondents viewed Amanat to be the general winner of all the participating parties.

Opinion polls 
Opinion polling in Kazakhstan may only be conducted by legal firms that are registered in accordance with the law of having at least five years of experience in conducting public surveys and had notified the Central Election Commission (CEC) of the polling firm's specialists and their experience alongside with the locations where they are conducted, and the analysis methods used. It is prohibited for pollsters to publish opinion survey results on the internet regarding the election of candidates and political parties five days before voting begins (from 14 March 2023) as well as on election day at premises or in polling stations.

In addition, independent polling is severely restricted in Kazakhstan, as Deputy Prosecutor General Jandos Ömiräliev on 18 February 2023 reported a number of unauthorised conducts of opinion polls, including one individual being fined under the decision by the prosecutor of Saryarqa District in Astana. Änuarbek Sqaqov, member of the Kazakhstan Union of Lawyers central council, argued that public opinion should be done so without conducting online polls on social media and instead be carried out only by certain organisations accredited with the CEC, to which he insisted that it would supposedly prevent the "abuse or manipulation of public opinion".

Political scientist Talğat Qaliev forecast that the ruling Amanat party would retain its party of power status in the 2023 election due to its "extensive network of branches" and prominent political figures in the party, followed by the Auyl party within the second place of the vote in which he cited the party's electorate support from a large-sized rural base.

Exit polls 
During election day, exit polls are conducted by members from legal organisations within and outside the premises of polling stations, to which Janar Muqanova, head of the Centre for Electoral Training of the Academy of Public Administration under the President, argued that a registration barrier provides a "good management" in professionally conducting sociological surveys. Organisations conducting exit polls publish their results after election day and within 12 hours after the announcements of preliminary results by the CEC.

Results

Mäjilis

See also
2022 Kazakh constitutional referendum
2022 Kazakh presidential election
2023 Kazakh Senate election
2023 Kazakh local elections

Notes

References 

Kazakhstan
Legislative
Elections in Kazakhstan